The Eighteen Upbuilding Discourses, sometimes called the Eighteen Edifying Discourses, is a collection of discourses produced by Søren Kierkegaard during the years of 1843 and 1844. Although he published some of his works using pseudonyms, these discourses were signed his own name as author. His discourses stress love, joy, faith, gratitude, thanksgiving, peace, adversity, impartiality, and equality before God and recommends them to the single individual.

These discourses are not the same as a sermon because a sermon is preached to a congregation while a discourse can be carried on between several people or even with oneself. These discourses or conversations should be "upbuilding", which means one would build up the other person, or oneself, rather than tear down in order to build up. Kierkegaard said: "Although this little book (which is called 'discourses,' not sermons, because its author does not have authority to 'preach', "upbuilding discourses," not discourses for upbuilding, because the speaker by no means claims to be a 'teacher') wishes to be only what it is, a superfluity, and desires only to remain in hiding".

He also wrote that he was without authority and he explained what he meant in his Journals 

Martin Buber discussed his idea of the Single One this way:

Titling and translation
David F. Swenson first translated the works in the 1940s and titled them the Edifying Discourses; however, in 1990, Howard V. and Edna H. Hong translated the works again but called them the Upbuilding Discourses. The word "upbuilding" was more in line with Kierkegaard's thought after 1846, when he wrote Christian discourses about suffering and later Christian deliberations about works of love. He was not a preacher or a teacher at the beginning of his discourses but by the end of his discourses he removed the word teacher. Thus he had progressed. Later in Practice in Christianity he states the problem he has with the modern sermon. "The Christian sermon today has become mainly observations. 'To observe' can mean in one sense to come very close to something, namely, to what one wishes to observe; in another sense, it signifies keeping very distant, infinitely distant, that is, personally." Practice in Christianity, Hong p. 233

Two Upbuilding Discourses, 1843

Three Upbuilding Discourses, 1843

Four Upbuilding Discourses, 1843

Two Upbuilding Discourses, 1844

Three Upbuilding Discourses, 1844

Four Upbuilding Discourses, 1844

References

Books by Søren Kierkegaard
1843 books
1844 books